"All On Our Own" is the New Zealand band Midnight Youth's second single from their first album, The Brave Don't Run. It debuted on the New Zealand Top 40 Singles Chart at number 18 and peaked at number 6. It was certified Gold in New Zealand, selling over 7,500 copies.

Year-end charts

References

2009 singles
Midnight Youth songs
2009 songs